The name Nate was used for three tropical cyclones in the Atlantic Ocean.
 Hurricane Nate (2005) — strong category 1 hurricane that stayed out in the open ocean.
 Hurricane Nate (2011) — weak short-lived Category 1 hurricane that made landfall in the Mexican state of Veracruz.
 Hurricane Nate (2017) — made landfall in Nicaragua as a moderate tropical storm, emerged into the northwestern Caribbean Sea, then strengthened into a strong Category 1 hurricane in the Gulf of Mexico before making landfall in Louisiana.

After the 2017 season, the name Nate was retired from future use in the Atlantic. It will be replaced with Nigel for the 2023 season.

See also
 Tropical cyclones named Nathan

Atlantic hurricane set index articles